Shatin Sports Association is a sports club based in the Sha Tin District of Hong Kong. The team plays in the Hong Kong First Division.

The club plays most of its home matches at Ma On Shan Sports Ground.

History

Shatin, as 2008–09 Hong Kong Junior Shield winners, were invited to take part in the 2008–09 HKFA Cup by the HKFA. The team was drawn against Kitchee in the first round and lost the game 3–0.

They once competed in the top-tier Hong Kong First Division during the 2009–10 season, but were relegated after finishing 9th out of 10 teams.

In 2017–18, the club achieved their highest ever finish, placing runners up in the First Division.

Honours

League
 Hong Kong First Division
Runners-up (1): 2017–18
 Hong Kong Second Division
Champions (1): 2008–09
 Hong Kong Third District Division
Champions (1): 2007–08

Cup Competitions
 Hong Kong Junior Shield
 Champions (3): 2007–08, 2008–09

 Hong Kong FA Cup Junior Division
 Champions: 2017–18

References

External links
 Sha Tin at HKFA
 Official Website 

Football clubs in Hong Kong
Hong Kong First Division League
1982 establishments in Hong Kong